The Secure Internet Protocol Router Network (SIPRNet) is "a system of interconnected computer networks used by the U.S. Department of Defense and the U.S. Department of State to transmit classified information (up to and including information classified SECRET) by packet switching over the 'completely secure' environment". It also provides services such as hypertext document access and electronic mail.  As such, SIPRNet is the DoD's classified version of the civilian Internet.

SIPRNet is the SECRET component of the Defense Information Systems Network.  Other components handle communications with other security needs, such as the  NIPRNet, which is used for nonsecure communications, and the Joint Worldwide Intelligence Communications System (JWICS), which is used for Top Secret communications.

Access

According to the U.S. Department of State Web Development Handbook, domain structure and naming conventions are the same as for the open internet, except for the addition of a second-level domain, like, e.g., "sgov" between state and gov: openforum.state.sgov.gov. Files originating from SIPRNet are marked by a header tag "SIPDIS" (SIPrnet DIStribution). A corresponding second-level domain smil.mil exists for DoD users.

Access is also available to a "...small pool of trusted allies, including Australia, Canada, the United Kingdom and New Zealand...".  This group (including the US) is known as the Five Eyes.

SIPRNet was one of the networks accessed by Chelsea Manning, convicted of leaking the video used in WikiLeaks' "Collateral Murder" release as well as the source of the US diplomatic cables published by WikiLeaks in November 2010.

Alternate names
SIPRNet and NIPRNet are referred to colloquially as SIPPERnet and NIPPERnet (or simply sipper and nipper), respectively.

See also
 CAVNET
 Classified website
 NIPRNet
 RIPR
 Intellipedia
 Protective distribution system
 NATO CRONOS

References

External links
 DISA
 Secret Internet Protocol Router Network (SIPRNET) by the Federation of American Scientists' Intelligence Resource Program
 They've Got Learning Locked Down – article detailing U.S. Coast Guard Academy classroom being first to get access to SIPRNet
 BBC Article on SIPRNet

Wide area networks
Cryptography
United States government secrecy
Military communications of the United States